William Blenkiron (born 21 July 1942) is a former English cricketer. A right-handed fast-medium bowler, Blenkiron took over 350 wickets in the first-class and one day game in a decade-long career spanning from 1964 to 1974. A useful lower-order right-hand batsman, he also scored 1,467 runs with two half centuries. Though born in Newfield, Durham, his county was Warwickshire (though he did represent his home county in the Minor Counties Championship). His son, Darren Blenkiron, did however play for Durham – and the England U-19 Test team – as a left-handed batsman between 1994 and 1996.

Blenkiron subsequently returned to Durham, where he sold cricket equipment for many years.

Notes

External links
 
 

1942 births
Warwickshire cricketers
Marylebone Cricket Club cricketers
Living people
Durham cricketers
English cricketers